Will R. Coursey (born October 22, 1978) is a U.S. politician who served as a Democratic member of the Kentucky House of Representatives, representing District 6, from February 2008 until 2019.

Education
Coursey attended University of Kentucky.

Elections
2012 Coursey was unopposed for both the May 22, 2012 Democratic Primary and the November 6, 2012 General election, winning with 15,021 votes.
2008 When District 6 Representative J. R. Gray left the Legislature and left the seat open, Coursey was unopposed for both the 2008 Democratic Primary and the November 4, 2008 General election with 14,839 votes.
2010 Coursey was unopposed for the May 18, 2010 Democratic Primary and the November 2, 2010 General election, winning with 8,945 votes (54.7%) against Republican nominee Monti Collins.
Coursey did not run for re-election in 2018 instead running for Judge Executive of Marshall County.

References

External links
Official page at the Kentucky General Assembly

Will Coursey at Ballotpedia
Will R. Coursey at the National Institute on Money in State Politics

Place of birth missing (living people)
1978 births
Living people
Democratic Party members of the Kentucky House of Representatives
People from Graves County, Kentucky
University of Kentucky alumni
21st-century American politicians